John Gutmann (1905 – June 12, 1998) was a German-born American photographer and painter.

Early life and education
Gutmann was born in 1905 in Breslau, Germany (now Wrocław, Poland) to an upper-middle-class Jewish family.

Career

Being Jewish, he was unable to exhibit his paintings or get a job teaching in Nazi Germany, and so he emigrated to the United States, arriving in San Francisco in late 1933. Gutmann reinvented himself as a photographer before he left Germany, purchasing a Rolleiflex and signing a photojournalism contract with Presse-Photo in 1933. He continued to work as a photojournalist for Presse-Photo from the West Coast until he signed on with PIX in 1936, an agency he worked with until 1962.

After arriving in San Francisco, one of the first news stories he documented was the 1934 West Coast waterfront strike. His work on other stories was later published in popular contemporary newsmagazines such as Time, Look, and The Saturday Evening Post. Some of his photographs of the Golden Gate International Exposition were published in Life in 1939. At the same time, he started teaching at San Francisco State College in 1936 and founded the photography department there in 1946.

In between, Gutmann served with the United States Office of War Information during World War II.

Gutmann taught at SF State until 1973. After his retirement, he began printing images from his archives, and began exhibiting his work at the Fraenkel Gallery and Castelli Graphics in the late 1970s. His work was later packaged into a traveling exhibition, "Beyond the Document", which moved from SFMOMA to the Museum of Modern Art and Los Angeles County Museum of Art starting in 1989.

Style
Gutmann's main subject matter was the American way of life, especially the Jazz music scene. Gutmann is recognized for his unique "worm's-eye view" camera angle.

He enjoyed taking photos of ordinary things and making them seem special. Kenneth Baker, art critic for the San Francisco Chronicle, wrote in 1997 that Gutmann was "an emissary of European modernism" who "brought a distinct angle of vision to the American scene" and his images demonstrated his "excitement of his witness to the [Depression-era] times". David Bonetti, art critic for the San Francisco Examiner, called Gutmann's output from the 1930s "his best–when, a young Jewish refugee, he experienced America as a bemused stranger in a strange land. Gutmann fell in love with Depression-era America, which he traveled by Greyhound Bus Line. He saw its cars, its rites and festival, its athletes, its women, its vibrant African American communities and its dynamic street life with European eyes."

Awards
Gutmann received a Guggenheim Fellowship in 1977.

Legacy
He created the John Gutmann Photography Fellowship Award, through the San Francisco Foundation.

The full archive of Gutmann's work is located at the Center for Creative Photography (CCP) at the University of Arizona in Tucson, which also manages the copyright of his work.

Collections (selected) 
Gutmann's work is held in the following permanent public collections:
 Addison Gallery of American Art, Andover, Massachusetts
 Art Institute of Chicago
 Cantor Arts Center, Stanford University
 Cleveland Museum of Art, Ohio
 Figge Art Museum, Davenport, Iowa
 Fotomuseum Winterthur, Switzerland
 Metropolitan Museum of Art, New York City
 Museum of Fine Arts, Boston
 Rijksmuseum Amsterdam
 San Francisco Museum of Modern Art

Exhibitions (selected)

 1941: Wondrous World, Young Memorial Museum, San Francisco.
 1941: Image of Freedom, The Museum of Modern Art, New York.
 1947: The Face of the Orient, Young Memorial Museum, San Francisco.
 1974: John Gutmann, Light Gallery, New York.
 1976: as i  saw it, San Francisco Museum of Modern Art.
 1985: Gutmann, Art Gallery of Ontario, Toronto.
 1990: Talking Pictures, 1934-1989, Fahey/Klein Gallery, Los Angeles.
 1998: John Gutmann, Rastlosese Amerika der 30er Jahre, Fotomuseum Winterthur, Switzerland.

Monographs (selected)

References

External links
 
 

1905 births
1998 deaths
German emigrants to the United States
20th-century American photographers
Artists from San Francisco
San Francisco State University faculty
People of the United States Office of War Information